Nikola Milošević (born 8 December 1996) is a Serbian footballer who plays as a forward.

Club career
Coming from FK Partizan Academy, he made his senior debut in the second-half of the 2014–15 season playing with Srem Jakovo in the Serbian League Belgrade. Next, he spent a season with Proleter Novi Sad in the Serbian First League, before joining Javor Ivanjica in summer 2019.

Personal life
He was born in England while his father, the former footballer Savo Milošević, played for Aston Villa.

Career statistics

Notes

References

1996 births
Footballers from Birmingham, West Midlands
English people of Serbian descent
Living people
English footballers
Serbian footballers
Association football forwards
FK Srem Jakovo players
FK Proleter Novi Sad players
FK Bežanija players
FK Javor Ivanjica players
Serbian First League players
Serbian SuperLiga players
FK Zvijezda 09 players
First League of the Republika Srpska players
Serbian expatriate footballers
Expatriate footballers in Bosnia and Herzegovina
Serbian expatriate sportspeople in Bosnia and Herzegovina